Sex & Violence is a television series that first aired on 17 November 2013 on OUTtv in Canada. The series stars Jennie Raymond as a lesbian police constable, Olympia Dukakis as a victim advocate, Jackie Torrens as a social worker and Kerry Fox and Johnny Terris as therapists. The original six-part show, focused on domestic violence, became the highest rated original drama in OUTtv's history and the channel announced its renewal on 8 May 2014. The third season debuted on OUTtv on 10 September 2017.

Cast and characters
Jennie Raymond as Constable Maria Roach
Jackie Torrens as Drucie MacKay
Olympia Dukakis as Alex Mandalakis
Kerry Fox as Brenda Shaw
Johnny Terris as Manny MacNeil
Michael McPhee as Constable Doug Downey
Callum Dunphy as Finn
Riley Raymer as Megan
Rob Joseph Leonard as Jasper Whynacht
Jeremy Akerman as Judge Seamus MacDonald
Pasha Ebrahimi as Dr. Padraig O'Carroll
Kevin Kincaid as Diarmuid
Candy Palmater as Louella
Glen Matthews as Stephen
Thom Payne as Steven
Naomi-Joy Blackhall-Butler as Marjorie Mbelu
Adrian Comeau as Rejean
Andria Wilson as Ginger Kim
Koumbie as Aria
Andrea Lee Norwood as Mona
Gharrett Patrick Paon as Crawford
Krista MacDonald as Krista Cirby

Production
The series is filmed in Nova Scotia, Canada. Thom Fitzgerald wrote and directed the original series, which also features Jeremy Akerman, Naomi-Joy Blackhall-Butler, Pasha Ebrahimi, Michael McPhee, Glen Matthews, Lisa-Rose Snow, Candy Palmater and Rob Joseph Leonard. Season 2 introduces new characters played by Johnny Terris, Kevin Kincaid and Riley Raymer.

Awards and nominations
2018 ACTRA Award for Best Lead Actress, Jennie Raymond
2018 ACTRA Award Nomination for Best Lead Actress, Jackie Torrens
2018 ACTRA Award Nomination for Best Lead Actor, Alex Purdy
2018 ACTRA Award Nomination for Best Supporting Actress, Koumbie
2018 ACTRA Award Nomination for Best Supporting Actor, Pasha Ebrahimi
2018 ACTRA Award Nomination for Best Supporting Actor, Gharrett Patrick Paon
2018 Screen Nova Scotia Award Nomination for Best TV Series
2018 Canadian Screen Award nomination for Best Performance by an Actress in a Continuing Leading Dramatic Role, Jennie Raymond
2016 ACTRA Award Nomination for Best Lead Actress, Jackie Torrens
2016 ACTRA Award for Best Lead Actress, Jennie Raymond
2016 ACTRA Award Nomination for Best Supporting Actress, Andria Wilson
2016 ACTRA Award Nomination for Best Supporting Actress, Krista MacDonald
2016 ACTRA Award Nomination for Best Supporting Actor, Glen Matthews
2016 Screen Nova Scotia Award Nomination for Best TV Series
2016 Canadian Screen Award nomination for Best Performance by an Actress in a Continuing Leading Dramatic Role, Jennie Raymond for the episode "Famous Last Words"
2016 Canadian Screen Award nomination for Best Performance by an Actor in a Featured Supporting Role in a Dramatic Program or Series, Callum Dunphy, for the episodes "Connection" and "Shelter"
2015 ACTRA Award Nomination for Best Lead Actress, Jackie Torrens
2015 ACTRA Award Nomination for Best Lead Actress, Jennie Raymond
2015 ACTRA Award for Best Supporting Actress, Carol Sinclair
2015 ACTRA Award Nomination for Best Supporting Actor, Michael McPhee
2015 ACTRA Award Nomination for Best Supporting Actor, Pasha Ebrahimi
2015 Canadian Screen Award (Gemini Award) nomination for Best Direction in a Dramatic Series, Thom Fitzgerald for the episode "Surface Scars"
2015 Canadian Screen Award (Gemini Award) nomination for Best Performance by an Actress in a Continuing Leading Dramatic Role, Jennie Raymond for the episode "Denial"
2015 Canadian Screen Award (Gemini Award) nomination for Best Performance by an Actress in a Continuing Leading Dramatic Role, Jackie Torrens, for the episode "Social Work"
2015 Canadian Screen Award (Gemini Award) nomination for Best Performance by an Actress in a Featured Supporting Role in a Dramatic Program or Series, Olympia Dukakis, for the episode "Social Work"
2015 Canadian Screen Award (Gemini Award) nomination for Best Performance in a Guest Role, Dramatic Series, Carol Sinclair, for the episode "Social Work"

Episode list

Season 1

Season 2

Season 3

References

External links

 

2010s Canadian drama television series
2013 Canadian television series debuts
2015 Canadian television series endings
Television shows filmed in Nova Scotia
English-language television shows
2010s Canadian LGBT-related drama television series
OutTV (Canadian TV channel) original programming